The 2015 Colorado State Rams football team represented Colorado State University during the 2015 NCAA Division I FBS football season. The Rams were led by first-year head coach Mike Bobo and played their home games at Sonny Lubick Field at Hughes Stadium. They were members of the Mountain Division of the Mountain West Conference. They finished the season 7–6, 5–3 in Mountain West play to finish in a four way tie for second place in the Mountain Division. They were invited to inaugural Arizona Bowl where they lost to fellow Mountain West member Nevada.

Schedule

Schedule Source:

Game Summaries

Savannah State

Minnesota

vs. Colorado

at UTSA

at Utah State

Boise State

Air Force

San Diego State

at Wyoming

UNLV

at New Mexico

at Fresno State

Arizona Bowl–Nevada

The Rams and Wolf Pack are both members of the Mountain West Conference. However, they are in opposite divisions and did not play each other in the regular season in 2015. This is the first time teams from the same conference have met in a non-championship bowl game since the 1979 Orange Bowl.

Players in the 2016 NFL Draft

References

Colorado State
Colorado State Rams football seasons
Colorado State Rams football